Ericeia congressa is a moth in the family Erebidae. It is known to be found in South Africa, Madagascar, Mauritius and Réunion. It was described by Francis Walker in 1858.

The wingspan was described as 18 lines (38 mm) and the body length as 8 lines (18 mm).

In Walker's List of the Specimens of Lepidopterous Insects in the Collection of the British Museum, he wrote:

References

Moths described in 1858
Moths of Madagascar
Moths of Mauritius
Moths of Réunion
Moths of Sub-Saharan Africa
Ericeia
Lepidoptera of South Africa